Josh Powell is an American politician who served as a Republican member of the Kansas House of Representatives, representing the 50th district from 2013 to 2015.

Committee Membership
 Commerce, Labor and Economic Development
 Energy and Environment
 Taxation

Electoral history

2012 Republican primary 

2012 General Election

References

External links
State Page
Campaign Website

Republican Party members of the Kansas House of Representatives
1986 births
Living people
Politicians from Topeka, Kansas
21st-century American politicians